Sasquatch Mountain (also called Devil on the Mountain) is a 2006 science fiction film produced by Grizzly Peak Productions for the Syfy channel, and directed by Steven R. Monroe.

Synopsis
A lonely tow-truck driver (Lance Henriksen) gets caught in a deadly struggle between a pair of bank robbers with a beautiful hostage (Cerina Vincent), local cops, and a monster that has come down from the Arizona mountains to eat human flesh.

Cast
 Lance Henriksen as Chase Jackson
 Cerina Vincent as Erin Price
 Michael Worth as Vin Stewart 
 Rance Howard as Harris Zeff
 Craig Wasson as Travis Cralle
 Tim Thomerson as Eli Van Cleef
 Raffaello Degruttola as Wade Clay
 Karen Kim as Kayla Keller
 Frank Rivera as Ken Robinson
 Chris Engen as Chris Logan
 Melanie Monroe as Raquel Jackson
 Kate Connor as Sara Jackson
 Alex Ballar as Kyle Carson
 Candace Raquel as Priscilla Moore
 Bob Harter as Sirom Sauls
 David Keller as Stanley Newton
 Dan Taylor as himself
 Tiny Ron as Sasquatch
 Denise Kerwin as Sue (uncredited)
 Jamie Gannon as Stranded Caller

Filming location
The movie was filmed in Flagstaff and Williams, Arizona.

Premiere
Its world premiere was the fifth most watched show of the week on the Sci-Fi Channel.

References

External links
 

2006 television films
2006 films
2000s English-language films
2006 science fiction films
Films shot in Arizona
Films set in Coconino County, Arizona
Bigfoot films
Syfy original films
2000s American films